Stephanie Lucile Gatschet (born March 16, 1983 in Philadelphia, Pennsylvania) is an actress, who has appeared on the soap operas Guiding Light (as Tammy Winslow) and  All My Children (as Madison North).

Early life and education
As a child, Gatschet took ballet, piano, and acting lessons. Her professional career began at the age of nine, when she appeared in her first play, Oedipus the King, at a local Philadelphia theatre. After performing in a few local plays, Gatschet began to appear in theatrical productions off-Broadway in New York City. She attended Julia R. Masterman School in Philadelphia, for middle school and high school. She also began to make commercials for television and radio, and to make episodic TV appearances in shows such as As the World Turns and Law & Order.

Prior to her role on Guiding Light, Gatschet was pursuing a Bachelor of Fine Arts at the Tisch School of the Arts at NYU. During her first year of college at New York University, Gatschet won roles in a few independent feature films like Roger Dodger and Virgin.

Career
Gatschet is best known for her portrayal of Tammy Layne Winslow, the daughter of Cassie Layne Winslow and her ex-husband, Rob Layne, on the CBS soap opera Guiding Light. She portrayed the character from July 2002 to March 2007. 

In 2007, Gatschet earned a Daytime Emmy Award nomination for Outstanding Younger Actress in a Drama Series.

On June 19, 2009, Gatschet began portraying a new character, Madison North, on All My Children on a recurring status. In December 2009, she signed a long-term contract and moved with the soap opera's production from New York to Los Angeles.

In 2015, Gatschet joined her friend and actor, Paul Gosselin, in the digital series, Misguided. She portrays an exaggerated version of herself.

Personal life
She is also a member of the Humane Society.

Filmography

References

External links 
StephanieGatschet.com – Official Website

1983 births
Living people
American soap opera actresses
Tisch School of the Arts alumni
Actresses from Philadelphia
American film actresses